Pniów  is a village in the administrative district of Gmina Toszek, within Gliwice County, Silesian Voivodeship, in southern Poland.

The village has a population of 644.

In the Liber fundationis episcopatus Vratislaviensis from around 1295–1305 the village was mentioned under the Latinized name Pnow. It was the location of a motte-and-bailey castle from the 13th-14th century, which is now an archaeological site.

Transport
The Voivodeship road 901 runs through Pniów, and the National road 94 runs nearby, southwest of the village.

References

Villages in Gliwice County
Archaeological sites in Poland